The Stokely Davis House (also known as Fairmount) was built in 1850 and included Italianate architecture and Greek Revival architecture.

The house was among the best two-story vernacular I-house examples in the county (along with William King House, Alpheus Truett House, Claiborne Kinnard House, Beverly Toon House, and Old Town, a.k.a. Thomas Brown House).

It had a two-story portico with Doric columns, and a two-story frame addition to the rear.  Its central hall plan interior included Greek Revival-influenced original fireplace mantles with architrave molding and original doors with architrave moldings.  Photography was not allowed in the interior, as of its listing.

It was listed on the National Register of Historic Places in 1988.

On the early morning of January 28, 2014, it burned down.

It was removed from the National Register on July 15, 2015.

References

Houses on the National Register of Historic Places in Tennessee
Italianate architecture in Tennessee
Greek Revival houses in Tennessee
Houses in Franklin, Tennessee
Houses completed in 1850
National Register of Historic Places in Williamson County, Tennessee
Former National Register of Historic Places in Tennessee